Beasties (originally entitled Bionaut) is a 1989 American horror film, written, produced and directed by Steven Paul Contreras.

Synopsis
The term "Beasties" is never used in the film, and is clearly designed to invoke Gremlins (which the box cites along with Back to the Future as influences), although the creatures are not the main focus of the film.

Plot
The film describes the carnage of extraterrestrial crafts landing on an area with many amorous teens. The plot deals with "Bionaut" (living) vessels, which have traveled back in time and have released small reconnaissance creatures that become violent when they get too far away from the Bionaut.

Release
It was bought by David DeCoteau and 200 VHS copies were distributed in 1991. 
There were only 200 copies sold, before it was withdrawn for poor sales.

External links
 Rogue Cinema review
 Interview with director Steven Paul Contreras about the film
 Critical Condition review

Official site
 https://web.archive.org/web/20141018042313/https://www.createspace.com/417464
 https://www.amazon.com/Beasties

1980s English-language films
American comedy horror films
1989 fantasy films
American science fiction comedy films
Films about time travel
1980s monster movies
1989 horror films
1989 films
1980s science fiction films
American monster movies
1980s comedy horror films
1989 comedy films
1980s American films